Mohamed Abdou Saleh El-Wahsh (Arabic : محمد عبده صالح الوحش) (May 9, 1929 – May 21, 2008) was an Egyptian footballer and football manager who played for Al Ahly SC in Egypt.
He coached Al-Ahly and also coached in other Arab countries

Early life 
He was born in Sayeda Zaynab district in Cairo, Egypt on 9 May 1929. He became a professional footballer in Al-Ahly then he coached the team in 1959.
In 1963 he traveled to Kuwait to work as an Educational supervisor for 5 years. He also coached the Kuwait national football team. then, he returned to coach Al Ahly.
He was appointed as the director of the technical department at the CAF in 1982. and was one of the 8 experts on the FIFA technical committee.
In 1988 he became the president of Al Ahly for 4 years until 1992. and in the year 2000 he was elected as the Chairman of the Egyptian Football Association.
He coached Al Ahly in Benghazi-Libya between 1969–1972.

Death 
He died on 21 May 2008 aged 79.

References 

1929 births
2008 deaths
Egyptian footballers
Association footballers not categorized by position
Egypt national football team managers
Kuwait national football team managers
Egyptian expatriate football managers
Al Ahly SC managers
Al Ahly SC players
Egyptian football managers
Egyptian expatriate sportspeople in Kuwait
Expatriate football managers in Kuwait
Footballers from Cairo
Egyptian Premier League players
Egyptian Premier League managers
1970 African Cup of Nations managers